The men's 5000 metres in speed skating at the 1976 Winter Olympics took place on 11 February, at the Eisschnellaufbahn.

Records
Prior to this competition, the existing world and Olympic records were as follows:

Results

References

Men's speed skating at the 1976 Winter Olympics